Sara Tappan Doolittle Robinson (née Lawrence) (July 12, 1827 – November 15, 1912) was a US writer and historian.  She served as the inaugural First Lady of Kansas, 1861–1863, being the second wife of Charles L. Robinson (1818–1894), the first Governor of Kansas.  Robinson is most notable for her book, Kansas : its interior and exterior life ; including a full view of its settlement, political history, social life, climate soil, productions, scenery, etc. (1856) during which time, her house was plundered and burned.  The book was considered "epoch making" for its time.

Biography
She was born in Belchertown, Massachusetts. She was the eldest daughter of Myron and Clarissa (Dwight) Lawrence. The distinguished people of the times visited the family home. Among the most noted were Daniel Webster, Harriet Martineau, Stephen Olin, Robert Rantoul, George Ashmun and W. B. Calhoun. 

She attended school in Belchertown and also studied at the New Salem Academy.  While attending school, she fell and injured her spine, which led to sympathetic blindness. Dr. Robinson (later Governor) was practicing medicine in Belchertown, where he was introduced to Miss Lawrence. Under his care, she regained her health. They married on October 30, 1851.

Robinson was a member of the Betty Washington Chapter of the Daughters of the American Revolution (D.A.R.).  She founded a research table in the Marine Biological Laboratory at Woods Hole, Massachusetts for young women. She gave the first donation toward marking the Santa Fe Trail. The Robinsons did not have any children.  She had been with the Sunflower State from its inception, and died in Lawrence, Kansas at the couple's "Oakridge" home in 1911. Their estate, valued at $200,000, was bequeathed to the University of Kansas. The couple's private papers, 1834–1911, are part of the holdings of the Kansas State Historical Society.

Selected publications
 Kansas; its interior and exterior life. Including a full view of its settlement, political history, social life, climate, soil, productions, scenery, etc. (1856)
 Personal recollections of Mrs. Sara T.D. Robinson of the Quantrell Raid of Aug. 21, 1863. (between 1863 and 1911)

References

1827 births
1912 deaths
People from Belchertown, Massachusetts
Historians of Kansas
People from Lawrence, Kansas
First Ladies and Gentlemen of Kansas
Victorian women writers
Victorian writers
American women historians
19th-century American women writers
19th-century American writers
Historians from Massachusetts